Salivanhana is the mythic son of a snake who conquered the great Raja Vikramaditya of Ujjain, a legendary king of Ujjain, India, famed for his wisdom, valour and magnanimity. The title "Vikramaditya" has also been assumed by many kings in Indian history, notably the Gupta King Chandragupta II.

He was the leader of the Saka nomads who invaded Gujarat on two occasions before and shortly after the beginning of the Christian era. He claimed his own area in 55 AD.

Characters in Hindu mythology